Ellen Banda-Aaku (born 6 May 1965) is a Zambian author, radio drama and film producer who was born in the UK and grew up in Africa. She is the author of two novels and several books for children, and has had short stories published in anthologies and other outlets.

Background
Born in Woking, Surrey, in 1965, she was the middle child of three, and grew up in Zambia. She was educated at the University of Zambia, where she obtained her BA in public administration, and she also holds an MA in financial management with social policy from Middlesex University and an MA in creative writing from the University of Cape Town.

Writing career

Ellen Banda-Aaku's first book, Wandi's Little Voice, won the Macmillan Writer's Prize for Africa in 2004. Of the title, the judges stated that the author's style reveals a rare gift for revealing the truth and contradictions at the core of human relationships. In 2007 she won the Commonwealth Short Story Competition for her story "Sozi's Box". Her first novel, Patchwork, won the 2010 Penguin Prize for African Writing and was shortlisted for the 2012 Commonwealth Book Prize. In 2006 Banda-Aaku sat on the judging panel for the Macmillan Writer's Prize for Africa. African Writing Online, many literatures, one voice In 2012 she was awarded the Zambia Arts Council Chairpersons Ngoma Award for her outstanding achievements in literature. She has conducted creative writing workshops in Rwanda, South Africa, Uganda and Zambia.

Her short stories have been published in anthologies in Australia, South Africa, the UK and the US, including in New Daughters of Africa (edited by Margaret Busby, 2019). 

In July 2020, Banda-Aaku was announced as chair of the panel judges for the Kalemba Short Story Prize 2020.

She is co-author with James Patterson of a children's book entitled The Elephant Girl, due to be released in July 2022.

Awards
 2004: Winner of Macmillan Writers Prize for Africa – Most Promising New Writer Award
 2007: Winner of Commonwealth Short Story Competition
 2010: Winner of Penguin Prize for African Writing
 2012: Zambia Arts Council Chairpersons Ngoma Award

 2012: Nominated for the Commonwealth Book Prize

Published works

Short stories
"Sozi's Box" (winner of the 2007 Commonwealth Short Story Competition). Published in Cousins Across the Seas, Phoenix Education, Australia, 2008. 
"Lost", in Jambula Tree and other stories, The Caine Prize for African Writing, 8th Annual Collection, Jacana Press, South Africa. 
"Made of Mukwa", in The Bed Book of Short Stories, Modjaji Books, South Africa. 
"Ngomwa", in African Women Writing Resistance: Contemporary Voices, Wisconsin Press, USA. 
"87 Tangmere Court", in New Daughters of Africa, 2019.

Novels

Patchwork, Penguin Publishers, South Africa, 2011. .
Madam 1st Lady, 2016. ,

Books for children
Wandi’s Little Voice,  Macmillan Educational Publishers, UK, 2004. 
Yours Faithfully Yogi, East African Educational Publishers, Kenya, 2008. 
Twelve Months, Oxford University Press, Kenya, 2010. 
Lula & Lebo, Head and Shoulders, Puo Publishing, South Africa. 
E is for e-waste, Worldreader, online publication.
Sula and Ja, Farafina Tuuti (Kachifo Limited) and Worldreader.

Further reading
Author Profiles, Ellen Banda-Aaku. African Writing Online, many literatures, one voice,  No. 11. Accessed 10 February 2013.
Browdy de Henandez, J., P. Dongala, O. Jolaosho, & A. Serafin (eds), 2010. African Writing Resistance Contemporary Voices, Wisconsin: Wisconsin Press.
Danro, A., 2011. "Ellen Banda-Aaku: A gifted writer", Times of Zambia, Lusaka. 26 February.
Kwei. R., 2004. "Women Here And There: Ellen Wins Macmillan’s Children’s Writer Award", Daily Graphic, Accra. 25 March.
Malan, R., ed. 2009. A – Z of African Writers: A guide to modern African writing in English. South Africa, Shuter & Shooter.
The Best of Zambia. 2011. Global Village Encyclopaedia GVPedia, Lusaka, Image Promotions.
14th Time of the Writer, 2011. Accessed 9 February 2013.

References

External links
 Ellen Banda-Aaku website
 Ellen Banda-Aaku at Story Terrace.

1965 births
Living people
Alumni of Middlesex University
University of Cape Town alumni
University of Zambia alumni
Zambian women writers
Zambian novelists
Zambian women short story writers
Zambian children's writers
Zambian women children's writers
21st-century short story writers
21st-century Zambian writers
21st-century Zambian women writers